Ba Ba Ti Ki Di Do is an EP by Sigur Rós, released in 2004 by Geffen Records. The EP consists of the songs the group composed for Merce Cunningham's dance piece Split Sides, which also involved Radiohead.

The title refers to the only spoken words throughout the whole piece. Merce Cunningham was recorded saying "ba ba, ti ki, ba ba, di do" and this can be heard in the last track, "Di Do".

Radiohead wrote music to the second half of Split Sides but are not planning on releasing their contribution.

Track listing 
 "Ba Ba" – 6:12
 "Ti Ki" – 8:49
 "Di Do" – 5:42

References 

Sigur Rós albums
2004 EPs
FatCat Records EPs
Geffen Records EPs